"Marge on the Lam" is the sixth episode of the fifth season of the American animated television series The Simpsons. It originally aired on the Fox network in the United States on November 4, 1993. After Marge invites her neighbor Ruth Powers to attend the ballet, they become friends. Homer grows jealous of their friendship and pursues them, resulting in a police chase led by Chief Wiggum that ends in near-disaster.

The episode, which serves largely as a parody of the film Thelma & Louise and the Dragnet franchise, was written by Bill Canterbury and directed by Mark Kirkland. Phil Hartman, Pamela Reed and George Fenneman were the guest stars.

Plot
After donating money to public television, Marge receives complimentary ballet tickets. Marge guilts Homer into accompanying her by reminding him of how he once volunteered as a human guinea pig in a United States Army experiment (which likely gave him his baldness) to avoid visiting Patty and Selma with her. However, Homer gets both of his arms stuck in vending machines at work. Disappointed and doubting Homer's story, Marge invites her neighbor, Ruth Powers, to go with her instead. They enjoy themselves and continue spending time together visiting bars and clubs in Springfield. Ruth demonstrates how to use a pistol to Marge, and they use a forlorn farmer's "precious antique cans" for target practice.

To show he can have a good time without Marge, Homer hires Lionel Hutz to babysit Bart, Lisa and Maggie. Finding Moe's Tavern more depressing than usual, Homer visits the hilltop where he and Marge used to spend time before they got married, but finds it is no fun without Marge. While tending his moonshine still on the hill, Chief Wiggum spots Homer and offers him a ride. At one point, Wiggum tries to make a routine traffic stop, but Ruth leads him on a high-speed chase instead. Ruth reveals that she is driving her ex-husband's stolen car as revenge for his failure to pay child support. Still in Wiggum's backseat, Homer realizes Marge is in Ruth's car and suspects she is leaving him after discovering that she can have a better time without him. Ruth successfully evades Wiggum by turning off her headlights, making him think he is chasing a "ghost car".

After seeing Marge and Ruth again the next morning, Wiggum continues his chase, joined by other police cars. Homer sees a cliff ahead and mistakenly thinks Marge and Ruth are attempting suicide. He uses a megaphone to apologize to Marge for all of his shortcomings and urges them not to drive into the Grand Chasm. Ruth, suddenly aware of the cliff, slams on the brakes and stops near its edge. Homer and Wiggum fail to stop in time, fly off the cliff's edge, and land in a mountain of landfill debris. They emerge slightly soiled from the garbage but otherwise unscathed.

A narrator then describes the fates of the characters in the style of Dragnet:

 The auto-theft charges against Ruth are dropped and her ex-husband is forced to pay all back child support due to Hutz botching his case.
 Hutz gladly receives $8 for his 32 hours of babysitting the Simpson children.
 Marge is charged with violating penal code Section 618A: "wanton destruction of precious antique cans", and is ordered to pay 50 cents to replace the farmer's cans and $2000 in "punitive damages and mental anguish".
 Homer is remanded to the US Army's Neurological Research Center at Fort Meade, Maryland for further testing.

Production
Dan Castellaneta actually used a bullhorn to record his part when Homer was talking on one. The sunset shown when Marge and Ruth are at the café was airbrushed in, although the episode was done before computer animation was put into practice.

Cultural references

Much of the plot, including the scene when Homer is in Moe's Tavern, and the climax where Ruth's blue convertible and Homer and Wiggum's fall over the chasm, is a parody of the Ridley Scott film Thelma & Louise. The music played during Homer's visualisation of the term ballet is Entrance of the Gladiators by Julius Fučík. Crystal Buzz Cola is a reference to the fad drink Crystal Pepsi, and when Homer reaches into the vending machine, a can of Fresca is seen in a skeletal hand stuck there. The comedian who performs at the telethon who the Simpson family does not find funny is a parody of Garrison Keillor. Ruth mistakenly inserts Lesley Gore's song "Sunshine, Lollipops and Rainbows" into her car stereo before beginning her and Marge's wild night out; later, Chief Wiggum plays the song on his police cruiser's stereo as "appropriate" car chase music. After extracting the wrong tape, Ruth pops in "Welcome to the Jungle" by Guns N' Roses. Quimby dancing in a night club is in reference to the Kennedys. When Marge gets hit on in the bar, the guy who does not talk is a caricature of show runner David Mirkin. The old man that comes out when Marge is shooting his cans is a parody of Walter Brennan. The episode's closing sequence is a reference to Dragnet. George Fenneman recorded the ending in the same fashion as he did on Dragnet.

Reception

Critical reception
The authors of the book I Can't Believe It's a Bigger and Better Updated Unofficial Simpsons Guide, Warren Martyn and Adrian Wood, said "Marge getting to let her hair down is always a treat, and in Ruth Powers she seems to have a real friend. A pity we don't see more of her".

The A.V. Club named Homer's line "Stupid TV! Be more funny!" as one of the quotes from The Simpsons that can be used in everyday situations.

On their 2000 album And Then Nothing Turned Itself Inside Out, indie rock band Yo La Tengo has a song entitled "Let's Save Tony Orlando's House"; the song is named after a telethon in Troy McClure's fictional CV seen in this episode.

Ratings
In its original broadcast, "Marge on the Lam" finished 32nd in ratings for the week of November 1–7, 1993, with a Nielsen rating of 13.1, equivalent to approximately 12.2 million viewing households. It was the highest-rated show on the Fox network that week, beating Beverly Hills, 90210.

References

External links

The Simpsons (season 5) episodes
1993 American television episodes
Parodies of films
Parody television episodes